General elections were held in Anguilla in 1989. The Anguilla National Alliance emerged as the largest party, winning three of the seven seats in the House of Assembly.

Results
David Carty and Claudel Romney were appointed as the nominated members.

References

Elections in Anguilla
Anguilla
1989 in Anguilla
Anguilla